The River Beyond the World is a 1996 novel by American novelist Janet Peery. Though her debut novel, the novel was a finalist for the National Book Award for Fiction. The novel follows the relationship of two women on separate sides of the Rio Grande, in South West Texas and Mexico.

References 

Novels set in Texas
Novels set in Mexico
Rio Grande
1996 American novels
1996 debut novels